This is a list of German football transfers in the winter transfer window 2007–08 by club. Only transfers of the Bundesliga, and 2. Bundesliga are included.

Bundesliga

Hertha BSC

In:

Out:

Note: Flags indicate national team as has been defined under FIFA eligibility rules. Players may hold more than one non-FIFA nationality.

Arminia Bielefeld

In:

Out:

VfL Bochum

In:

Out:

Werder Bremen

In:

Out:

Energie Cottbus

In:

Out:

Borussia Dortmund

In:

Out:

MSV Duisburg

In:

Out:

Eintracht Frankfurt

In:

Out:

Hamburger SV

In:

Out:

Hannover 96

In:

Out:

Karlsruher SC

In:

Out:

Bayer Leverkusen

In:

Out:

Bayern Munich

In:

Out:

1. FC Nürnberg

In:

Out:

F.C. Hansa Rostock

In:

Out:

Schalke 04

In:

Out:

VfB Stuttgart

In:

Out:

VfL Wolfsburg

In:

Out:

2. Bundesliga

Alemannia Aachen

In:

Out:

Erzgebirge Aue

In:

Out:

FC Augsburg

In:

Out:

SC Freiburg

In:

Out:

Greuther Fürth

In:

Out:

1899 Hoffenheim

In:

Out:

Carl Zeiss Jena

In:

Out:

1. FC Kaiserslautern

In:

Out:

TuS Koblenz

In:

Out:

1. FC Köln

In:

Out:

Mainz 05

In:

Out:

Borussia Mönchengladbach

In:

Out:

1860 Munich

In:

Out:

Kickers Offenbach

In:

Out:

VfL Osnabrück

In:

Out:

SC Paderborn

In:

Out:

FC St. Pauli

In:

Out:

Wehen Wiesbaden

In:

Out:

External links
 Official site of the DFB 
 Kicker.de 
 Official site of the Bundesliga 
 Official site of the Bundesliga 

Trans
German
2007